Garvin is both a surname and a given name.

Garvin may also refer to:

Places
Garvin, Minnesota, United States
Garvin, Oklahoma, United States
Garvin County, Oklahoma, United States

Other uses
Thunderbird - The Garvin School of International Management